The Tong Man is a 1919 American thriller film directed by William Worthington and produced by Haworth Pictures Corporation.

The Tong Man survives and is available on home video. The film has long been preserved by the Library of Congress.

Plot
As described in a film magazine, Luk Chen (Hayakawa), whose heart beats for Sen Chee (Eddy) and for her alone, is commissioned by the tong of which he is a member to murder her father for failure to deliver her to Ming Tai (Roberts), a power in San Francisco's Chinatown. His love proves stronger than his sense of duty and he fails to execute the command, so Ming Tai performs the duty in his stead. Ming Tai then abducts Sen Chee. Luk Chen effects a rescue and they conceal themselves in a dungeon belonging to Ming Tai. Their enemy discovers them and for a time it seems their end is only seconds away. They are then rescued and make their way by boat to China.

Cast
Sessue Hayakawa as Luk Chen
Helen Jerome Eddy as Sen Chee
 Marc Roberts as Ming Tai
Toyo Fujita as Louie Toy
Yutaka Abe as Lucero (credited as Jack Yutaka Abbe)

References

External links 

 
 
lobby poster

1919 films
Haworth Pictures Corporation films
Films directed by William Worthington
American crime thriller films
American black-and-white films
Films about organized crime in the United States
American silent feature films
1910s crime thriller films
Film Booking Offices of America films
1910s American films
Silent thriller films
Films with screenplays by Richard Schayer
Films set in San Francisco
Tongs (organizations)